The Giardino Bellini (also known as Villa Bellini; English translation: "Bellini Garden") is the oldest urban park of Catania.

It occupies 70.942 m².

History
 Before the construction of a public garden, the area was occupied by the garden maze or labyrinth owned by the Ignazio Paternò Castello, prince of Biscari. In 1854, the Comune di Catania bought the area of the maze, and in 1864 started to adapt the area into a public garden. Starting from 1875, the municipality acquired several further areas surrounding the maze, and two years later the work to unify these areas was undertaken.

A guide from 1867 reports the gardens housed swan and geese, deer and cows, an aviary, and an enclosure of monkeys. The park has a white marble bust depicting Vincenzo Bellini and completed by Tito Angiolini.

The Giardino Bellini was finally inaugurated in 1883.

See also
Giardino Pacini

References

Further reading

External links

 Giardino Bellini at the Botanical Departement's website of University of Catania

Catania